Mayfield is an unincorporated community in Beckham County, Oklahoma, United States, It is on Oklahoma State Highway 30,  north of Erick. Its post office opened on December 23, 1902; its first postmaster was Alfred S. Mayfield, for whom the community is named.

References

Unincorporated communities in Beckham County, Oklahoma
Unincorporated communities in Oklahoma